Joseph Sam Sesay (born on April 26, 1959 in Kamasasa, Kambia District, British Sierra Leone) is a Sierra Leonean politician who served as Minister of Agriculture under the All People Congress government of President Ernest Bai Koroma.

Early life and education
Joseph Sam Sesay was born in 1959 in the rural village of Kamasasa, Tonko Limba chiefdom, Kambia District in the Northern Province of British Sierra Leone to ethnic Limba parents. His father was a clergyman and his mother was a farmer. His father established the Wesleyan School and Church in Tonko Limba chiefdom.

Education and career
Sam Sesay attended primary school in Kamakwie, Bombali District and then proceeded to the Wesleyan Secondary School also in Kamakwie.  AFter completing his secondary education, Sam Sesay attended the Milton Margai Teachers' College in Freetown, graduating with a Higher Teachers' Certificate (HTC). Sam Sesay later taught at the Pampana High School in Magburaka, and Baton Memorial School in Makeni. 

In 1981, he moved to Russia, where he completed MSc. and PhD (candidate of Science) degrees at the Timiryazev Agricultural Academy in Moscow. Sesay has also undergone postgraduate studies at the International Institute of Social Studies in The Hague, the Netherlands. He also completed a certificate programme at the World Bank. 

In 1992 to 2000, he worked in the Planning Evaluation Monetary and Statistics division of the then Ministry of Agriculture and Fisheries. In April 2000 he moved over to the National Commission for Resettlement Rehabilitation and Reconstruction (NCRRR) as Programme Manager and Evaluation Unit, after which he became Director of that unit. In 2004, Sesay had two offers, one - to go as the Director of Planning at the Commonwealth, and two, to work as the Civil Affairs Officer with the UN in Liberia.  He decided to work in Liberia and was in charge of the civil affairs unit responsible for the Forestry Development Authority.

Personal life
Sam Sesay is married with two children. He enjoy listening to music, read newspapers and follow sports, particularly football.

External links
 http://www.sierraexpressmedia.com/id316.html

1959 births
Living people
Government ministers of Sierra Leone
All People's Congress politicians
People from Kambia District